Kalgeh Zari (also Romanized as Kalgeh Zarī and Kal Geh Zarī) is a village in Tayebi-ye Garmsiri-ye Jonubi Rural District, in the Central District of Kohgiluyeh County, Kohgiluyeh and Boyer-Ahmad Province, Iran. At the 2006 census, its population was 28, in 7 families.

References 

Populated places in Kohgiluyeh County